Wanshengwei Station is an interchange station between Lines 4 and 8 of the Guangzhou Metro, and also the terminus of Line 8. It started operations on 26 December 2005. It is an underground station and located near the junction of Xingang East Road and Xinjiao South Road in Haizhu District.

This station, like the others on Line 8 (except Changgang station, Baogang Dadao station, Shayuan station, and Fenghuang Xincun station, which were added after the dividing of Line 2), ran as part of a single route with the current Line 2 until the extension to both lines opened in late 2010.

The station is the terminus of the Haizhu Tram line of Guangzhou Trams, which runs to Canton Tower Station.

Station layout

Exits

References

Railway stations in China opened in 2005
Guangzhou Metro stations in Haizhu District